Alfred "Fred" Rössner (August 16, 1911 – December 25, 2005) was an Austrian cross-country skier who competed in the 1936 Winter Olympics. He was born in Sankt Johann am Tauern and died in Salzburg.

In 1936 he was a member of the Austrian relay team which finished eighth in the 4x10 km relay competition. In the 18 km event he finished 39th.

External links
 
profile

1911 births
2005 deaths
Austrian male cross-country skiers
Olympic cross-country skiers of Austria
Cross-country skiers at the 1936 Winter Olympics
People from Murtal District
Sportspeople from Styria
20th-century Austrian people